S.S. Lazio returned to Serie A this season, finishing 10th and reaching the quarter final of the Coppa Italia.

Squad

Goalkeepers
  Valerio Fiori
  Silvano Martina

Defenders
  Paolo Beruatto
  Luca Brunetti
  Antonio Delucca
  Angelo Gregucci
  Nelson Gutiérrez
  Raimondo Marino
  Marco Monti
  Massimo Piscedda

Midfielders
  Antonio Elia Acerbis
  Giancarlo Camolese
  Luigi Di Biagio
  Cristiano Di Loreto
  Alfonso Greco
  Andrea Icardi
  Ciro Muro
  Gabriele Pin
  Gabriele Savino
  Claudio Sclosa

Attackers
  Gustavo Dezotti
  Paolo Di Canio
  Antonio Rizzolo
  Rubén Sosa

Competitions

Serie A

League table

Matches

Coppa Italia 

First round- Group 3

Second round - Group 5

Quarterfinals

References

External links
RSSSF - Italy 1988/89

S.S. Lazio seasons
Lazio